Robert G. Clark Jr. (born October 3, 1928) is an American politician who served in the Mississippi House of Representatives from 1968 to 2004, representing the 47th district. He was the first African-American member of the Mississippi Legislature since 1894.

Early life and education 
Robert G. Clark was born to a landowning family in Ebenezer, Holmes County, Mississippi; his great-grandfather had first bought land after the American Civil War and his father Robert continued to farm it. Clark received his undergraduate degree from Jackson State University and a Master's Degree in Administration and Educational Services from Michigan State University, nearly completing his PhD before entering politics. In 1960, some 800 independent black landowners held nearly half the land area of Holmes County, an unusual situation in the state, which along with most of the American South had sharecropping as the predominant agricultural system.

Civil rights and politics 
While working as a teacher in Holmes County, Clark became involved in the civil rights movement, which had been working to register and educate voters since 1963. After passage of the Voting Rights Act of 1965, he agreed to be a candidate in 1967 of the Freedom Democratic Party. Since assignment of a federal registrar in the county in November 1965, the FDP registered thousands of black voters for the first time since the disfranchisement of their ancestors in 1890.

Clark was elected to the Mississippi House of Representatives in 1967 by the black majority of the county, taking his seat on January 2, 1968. He was the first African American elected to the Mississippi State Legislature since the Reconstruction era. Until 1976 he was the only African-American representative in the state house, having been repeatedly returned to office. He was repeatedly re-elected, serving until 2003.

In 1977 Clark became the first black committee chairman in the Mississippi House of Representatives. He was named to head the "Education Committee, a position he held for ten pivotal years of change and reform in Mississippi's educational system.  He was at the helm of the Education Committee when the House passed the highly acclaimed 1982 Education Reform Act, as well as the 1984 Vocational Education Reform Act.

In January 1992, he was elected as Speaker Pro Tempore. He was re-elected to that position at the start of the 1996 session and again re-elected at the start of the 2000 session.  When he retired from the Mississippi House of Representatives in December 2003, he was the longest-serving member in continuous House service. He was succeeded in office by his son, Bryant Clark.

In 2004, Clark became the first African American to have a Mississippi state building named after him. As a legislator Clark was known as a statesman, able to work with all colleagues.

Notes

References 
 

 
 

1928 births
African-American history of Mississippi
African-American state legislators in Mississippi
Jackson State University alumni
Living people
Members of the Mississippi House of Representatives
Michigan State University alumni
People from Holmes County, Mississippi
21st-century African-American people
20th-century African-American people